Robert Marion Clawson (August 10, 1905 – April 12, 1998) was an American agricultural economist. He worked for the United States Department of Agriculture from 1929 to 1946.

In 1948, he became the second director of the Bureau of Land Management, where he served until 1953.

Clawson spent 1953-1955 in Israel as a member of the Economic Advisory Staff, a group of American economists who were invited to Israel by David Ben-Gurion.

He spent the rest of his career at Resources for the Future. During his 20 years at Resources for the Future, Clawson worked on forestry resources and policy. He was active with the organization at the time of his death at age 92.

Personal life 

In 1973 Clawson married Nora McGirr Roots, daughter of Ernest McGirr.

Selected publications 

 Forests for Whom and for What?  
 New Deal Planning : The National Resources Planning Board 
 From Sagebrush to Sage : The Making of a Natural Resource Economist 
 The Economics of Outdoor Recreation 
 The Agricultural Potential of the Middle East

References 

1905 births
1998 deaths
People from Elko, Nevada
20th-century American economists
University of Nevada alumni
Harvard University alumni
Economists from Nevada
Bureau of Land Management personnel
Resources for the Future
American expatriates in Israel